The 2005 Dutch Figure Skating Championships took place between 7 and 9 January 2005 in The Hague. Skaters competed in the disciplines of men's singles, ladies' singles, and ice dancing.

Senior results

Men

Ladies

Ice dancing

External links
 results

Dutch Figure Skating Championships
Dutch Figure Skating Championships, 2005
2005 in Dutch sport